Stonys is the masculine form of a Lithuanian family name. Its feminine forms  are: Stonienė (married woman or widow) and Stonytė (unmarried woman).

The surname may refer to:
 Audrius Stonys, Lithuanian film director
 Modestas Stonys, Lithuanian footballer
 Sigutė Stonytė, Lithuanian opera singer

Lithuanian-language surnames